Mitsutake Makita (born 1908, date of death unknown) was a Japanese ski jumper. He competed in the individual event at the 1932 Winter Olympics.

References

1908 births
Year of death missing
Japanese male ski jumpers
Olympic ski jumpers of Japan
Ski jumpers at the 1932 Winter Olympics
People from Sakhalin Oblast